Zia Sarhadi (born Fazl-e-Qadir Sethi 1914 in Peshawar, North West Frontier Province – 27 January 1997 in Karachi, Sindh) was a Pakistani screenwriter and director of films in the Indian Film Industry, whose career spanned what is widely considered the Golden Age of Indian Cinema.

Career
He was the father of TV and radio actor Khayyam Sarhadi and grandfather of actress Zhalay Sarhadi. As a director, he was probably best known for his films Humlog (1951), Baiju Bawara (1952) and Footpath (1953).

He was involved in writing the script as a consultant for the film Mother India (1957), considered one of the greatest Indian films of all time, but is rarely credited for his contribution. Described as an"unaffiliated Marxist", his films were known for dealing with social issues of the period. His film Footpath, for instance, dealt with issues of moral guilt in the 1950s India.

Filmography

References

External links
 

Pakistani screenwriters
Pakistani film directors
People from Peshawar
1914 births
1997 deaths
Hindi-language film directors
Hindi screenwriters
20th-century Indian screenwriters
Indian lyricists
Indian songwriters